For the airport in Mexico see Francisco Sarabia International Airport

The airstrip lies between the Itata River and the highway running alongside it. The runway has an additional  of unpaved overrun on the northwest end. There are low hills in all quadrants.

See also

Transport in Chile
List of airports in Chile

References

External links
OpenStreetMap - Torreón
OurAirports - Torreón
FallingRain - Torreón Airport

Airports in Chile
Airports in Ñuble Region